Hanspeter is a given name. Notable people with the name include:

Hanspeter Bellingrodt (born 1943), Colombian former sports shooter
Hanspeter Bennwitz (born 1930), German musicologist
Hanspeter Hasler (born 1953), Swiss retired slalom canoeist
Hanspeter Keiser (1925–2007), Swiss cabarettist, comedian, radio personality, actor
Hanspeter Knobel (born 1963), Swiss biathlete
Hanspeter Kriesi (born 1949), professor of political science at the European University Institute in Florence
Hanspeter Kyburz (born 1960), contemporary Swiss composer of classical music
Hanspeter Lanig (1935–2022), German alpine Olympic skier
Hanspeter Latour (born 1947), Swiss football manager and former goalkeeper
Hanspeter Lüthi (born 1944), Swiss rower
Hanspeter Lutz (born 1954), Swiss handball player
Hanspeter Pfister (born 1964), Swiss computer scientist
Hanspeter Schild (born 1950), Swiss former footballer
Hanspeter Seiler (born 1933), Swiss politician and President of the National Council
Hanspeter Stocker (born 1936), Swiss footballer
Hanspeter Vogt (born 1927), Swiss speed skater
Hanspeter Würmli (born 1953), Swiss former freestyle swimmer
Hanspeter Zaugg (born 1952), Swiss football manager and former player
Hanspeter Ziörjen (born 1958), Swiss sports shooter

See also
Hanns Peters
Hans-Peter
Hans Peters